Sir Mark Harris Getty  (born 9 July 1960) is an Irish businessman who is the co-founder and chairman of Getty Images.

Life and career
A member of the prominent Getty family, he is the younger son of John Paul Getty Jr. and his first wife, Gail Harris. Getty was born in Rome, Italy. He attended Taunton School in England and later studied Philosophy and Politics at St Catherine's College, Oxford.

Getty began his career at securities firm Kidder, Peabody & Co. in New York City and then joined Hambros Bank Ltd in London. In 1993, he drove his family's founding investment in andBeyond, the world's leading ecotourism business, and still acts as chairman of the business.

In 1994, he co-founded the photographic agency Getty Images with Jonathan Klein. Getty Images is the world's leading supplier of imagery for the media, corporate, and advertising sectors. In 2003, he inherited Wormsley Park from his father. In 2008, Getty became chairman of the trustees of the National Gallery in London, a post he held until 2016. In 2017, Getty became chairman of the British School at Rome.

References

External links

Getty Images Bio
Forbes profile

21st-century Irish businesspeople
Irish businesspeople
Irish people of American descent
Mark
People educated at Taunton School
1960 births
Living people
Honorary Knights Commander of the Order of the British Empire
Naturalised citizens of Ireland